Fabián González (born 8 May 1992) is a Spanish artistic gymnast. He represented Spain at the 2012 Summer Olympics, finishing 9th in the individual all-around competition. In 2015, he announced that he was taking a break from competitive gymnastics for personal and health reasons.

References

1992 births
Living people
Spanish male artistic gymnasts
Gymnasts at the 2012 Summer Olympics
Olympic gymnasts of Spain
Sportspeople from Palma de Mallorca
European Games competitors for Spain
Gymnasts at the 2015 European Games
20th-century Spanish people
21st-century Spanish people